MMST (Hebrew:  MMŠT) is a word written in Paleo-Hebrew abjad script. It appears exclusively on LMLK seal inscriptions, seen in archaeological findings from the ancient Kingdom of Judah, whose meaning has been the subject of continual controversy.

ממשת transliterations into Latin alphabet
 Mamsatt (Ginsberg, 1948)
 Mamshat & variants
 Mamshath (Conder, 1901)
 Mamshat (Sellers and Albright, 1931)
 Mamschat (Galling, 1937); reads in German like Mamshat in English
 Mameshat (Yeivin, 1961)
 Mamshet (Aharoni, 1960)
 Mamshit & variants
 Mamshith (Driver, 1909)
 Mamshit (Vilnay, 1960)
 Memsath (McCown, 1947)
 Memshat & variants
 Memshat (Bliss, 1900)
 Memshath (Macalister, 1905)
 Mimshat (Macalister, 1925)

A place?
Charles Warren excavated the first two specimens in the original 1868–1869 excavations at Jerusalem (Warren, 1870); however, those were both only partial impressions showing the final two letters ST. The first complete inscription was published by F. J. Bliss after excavating it from Tell Ej-Judeideh (Bliss, 1900), later determined to be biblical Moresheth-Gath. Beginning then, here is a list of all the ancient sites scholars have associated with it:
 Moresheth-Gath (Clermont-Ganneau, 1899)
 Mampsis (also known as Kurnub; Hommel, 1901)
 Mareshah (Vincent, 1907)
 Tel Masos (see articles Tel Masos (fr) in French, and תל משוש (he) in Hebrew Wikipedia; also known as Tell el-Meshash or Khirbat al-Mishash; Abel, 1938)
 An unknown site near Gezer such as Emmaus (Albright, 1943)
 Jerusalem (via MMS[L]T) or one of its suburbs (Ginsberg, 1948)
 Tel 'Erani (Yeivin, 1961)
 Tel 'Ira (see French article Tel Ira in French Wikipedia; Yadin, 1961)
 An unknown site between Bethlehem & Hebron (Lang, 1972); Bethlehem vicinity preferred (Rainey, 1982)
 An unknown site between Beth Shemesh & Aijalon such as Emmaus (Lang, 1972)
 Emmaus (also known as Amwas; Lemaire, 1975)
 Ramat Rachel (Barkay, 1993)

These proposals fall into two main streams of thought. One school places MMST in a geographical region based on the identification of three other regions surrounding Hebron, Sokho, and Ziph (the other words on the LMLK seals). The chief problem is that the majority of the seal impressions were not found in any particular region associated with one of the four inscriptions. For example, the majority of HBRN stamps were found at Lachish significantly to the west. An alternative strategy identifies MMST in the vicinity of Jerusalem (which includes Ramat Rachel) based upon the datum that the majority of MMST stamps were excavated in and around there. The chief problem is that there were more HBRN stamps than MMST found at Jerusalem and more Z(Y)F stamps than MMST found at Ramat Rachel (Grena, 2004, pp. 354–360).

In further support of a place name interpretation is the notion that MMST was lost from the Hebrew Masoretic version of the Book of Joshua, but preserved in a form corrupted beyond recognition through Greek transliteration in the Septuagint. The Septuagint version contains eleven additional place names, one of which could correspond to the lost MMST (Rainey, 1982, p. 59; cf.  in the New Revised Standard Version):

"...eleven cities, and their villages..."
 Theco
 Ephratha (Baethleem)
 Phagor
 Aetan
 Culon
 Tatam
 Thobes
 Carem
 Galem
 Thether
 Manocho

A person?
In 1905, R.A.S. Macalister suggested that MMST could also mean Mareshah, but instead of identifying it with the town, he proposed that the seal referred to a potter (or family of potters).

A proclamation?
If the LMLK seal inscriptions were votive slogans or mottoes instead of geographical places, MMST may share the same etymological root as MMSLTW (Strong's Concordance #4475), a Hebrew word used in the Bible translated alternately as domain, dominion, force, government, power, realm, responsibility, rule.

And Hezekiah was attentive to them, and showed them all the house of his treasures--the silver and gold, the spices and precious ointment, and all his armory--all that was found among his treasures. There was nothing in his house or in all his dominion that Hezekiah did not show them.

Likewise :

After this Sennacherib king of Assyria sent his servants to Jerusalem (but he and all the forces with him laid siege against Lachish), to Hezekiah king of Judah, and to all Judah who were in Jerusalem...

Note that Ginsberg suspected such a literal reading of the inscription in a paper presented in 1945, but changed to the geographic association with Jerusalem in 1948.

Note also the well-known Moabite inscription from Kerak that begins with the fragmented phrase ...MSYT MLK. While we may never know if the first word is a compound of KMS, the Moabite deity mentioned in the Bible as Chemosh, the MMST on the LMLK seals may have been "MMSYT" written scriptio defectiva with a possible relation to the Arabic "mumsa", "place where one spends the night".

See also
Archaeology of Israel

References

Bibliography
 Abel, Pere [Félix-Marie] (1938). Geographie de la Palestine II. p. 377, footnote 17 (in French).
 
 
 Barkay, G. (personal communication quote by editor Ephraim Stern; 1993). Ramat Rahel in New Encyclopedia of Archaeological Excavations in the Holy Land. p. 1267.
 
 
 
 Galling, Kurt (see Kurt Galling in German Wikipedia; 1937). Biblisches Reallexikon. pp. 337–340 (in German).
 
 
 
 
 
 
 Macalister, R. A. S. (1925). A Century of Excavation in Palestine. pp. 37–38, 190–1.
 McCown, Chester Charlton (1947). Tell en-Nasbeh I: Archaeological and Historical Results. pp. 156–161.
 
 
 
 
 
 
 
 

Ancient Israel and Judah
Archaeological sites in Israel
Seals (insignia)
Cylinder and impression seals in archaeology

he:חותמות למלך#פרשנויות